This article lists the etymology of chemical elements of the periodic table.

History
Throughout the history of chemistry, several chemical elements have been discovered.  In the nineteenth century, Dmitri Mendeleev formulated the periodic table, a table of elements which describes their structure.  Because elements have been discovered at various times and places, from antiquity through the present day, their names have derived from several languages and cultures.

Named after places

Forty-one of the 118 chemical elements have names associated with, or specifically named for, places around the world or among astronomical objects. Thirty-two of these have names tied to the places on the Earth and the other nine have names connected to bodies in the Solar System: helium for the Sun; tellurium for the Earth; selenium for the Moon; mercury (indirectly), uranium, neptunium and plutonium for the major planets (note: Pluto was still considered a planet at the time of plutonium's naming); and cerium and palladium for smaller objects.

Named after people

Nineteen elements are connected with the names of twenty people (as curium honours both Marie and Pierre Curie). Fifteen elements were named after scientists; four other have indirect connection to the names of non-scientists. Only gadolinium and samarium occur in nature; the rest are synthetic. Glenn T. Seaborg and Yuri Oganessian were the only two who were alive at the time of being honored with having elements named after them, and Oganessian is the only one still living. Elements named after four non-scientists in this table were actually named for a place or thing which in turn had been named for these people: Samarium was named for the mineral samarskite from which it was isolated. Berkelium and livermorium are named after cities of Berkeley, California and Livermore, California are the locations of the University of California Radiation Laboratory and Lawrence Livermore National Laboratory, respectively. Americium is indirectly connected to Amerigo Vespucci via America.

Named after mythological entities
Also, mythological entities have had a significant impact on the naming of elements, directly or indirectly. Cerium, europium, helium, iridium, mercury, neptunium, niobium, palladium, plutonium, promethium, selenium, titanium, thorium, uranium and vanadium and all connected to mythological deities.

Named after minerals
Elements may also have been named after minerals (in which they were discovered). For example, beryllium is named after beryl.

Controversies and failed proposals

Other element names given after people have been proposed but failed to gain official international recognition.  These include columbium (Cb), hahnium (Ha), joliotium (Jl), and kurchatovium (Ku), names connected to Christopher Columbus, Otto Hahn, Irène Joliot-Curie, and Igor Kurchatov; and also cassiopeium (Cp), a name coming from the constellation Cassiopeia and is hence indirectly connected to the mythological Cassiopeia.

Current naming practices and procedures

For the last two decades, IUPAC has been the governing body for naming elements. IUPAC has also provided a temporary name and symbol for unknown or recently synthesized elements.

List

See also
List of chemical elements naming controversies
Naming of elements

References

Further reading
 Eric Scerri, The Periodic System, Its Story and Its Significance, Oxford University Press, New York, 2007.

Name Etymologies
Etymology
Lists of etymologies